
Jelly is a given name, surname, and nickname. It may refer to the following people:

Surname
 David Jelly (1847–1911), Canadian politician
 Ted Jelly (born 1921), English former footballer
 William Jelly (1835–1900), Canadian politician

Nickname
 Floyd Jelly Gardner (1895–1977), American baseball player in the Negro leagues
 Norman Jackson (baseball) (1909–1980), American baseball player in the Negro leagues
 Frank Nash (1887–1933), American bank robber
 Olan Jelly Taylor (1910–1976), American baseball player in the Negro leagues

See also
 Jelly Roll Morton (1890–1941), American ragtime and early jazz pianist, bandleader and composer
 Jelly (disambiguation)
 Jelle, a Dutch given name

Lists of people by nickname